Kirsten Fehrs (born September 12, 1961, in Wesselburen) is a Lutheran bishop of the Evangelical Lutheran Church in Northern Germany.

Life 
Fehrs studied Lutheran theology at University of Hamburg.  In December 1990 she was ordained as pastor in Hamburg. She worked as pastor of St. James' Church, one of Hamburg's principal churches. In 2011, the synod (church parliament) of the North Elbian Evangelical Lutheran Church elected her bishop of the regions Hamburg and Lübeck. She has been bishop of the Evangelical Lutheran Church in Northern Germany since the North Elbian Church merged with the Evangelical Lutheran Church of Mecklenburg and the Pomeranian Evangelical Church in 2012.

Works by Fehrs 
 Miteinander leben lernen – Gemeindenahe Erwachsenenbildung in ländlicher Region. In: forum EB (= Erwachsenenbildung) 02/1997.
 Lebensbegleitung als Kooperationsmodell – Bericht über einen Kooperationsprozess der Familien-Bildungsstätte und der Erwachsenenbildung im Kirchenkreis Rendsburg. In: forum EB. 02/2001.
 Personalentwicklung konkret – Ansätze und Gespräche. In: Lernort Gemeinde. 08/02.
 Macht ist für mich positiv besetzt. In: Marlis Prinzing: Meine Wut rettet mich. Verlag Kösel, 2012, pages 251ff.

External links 

 Website by bishop Kirsten Fehrs (German)
 NDR.de: Kirsten Fehrs zur neuen Bischöfin gewählt (German)

References 

Bishops of Hamburg
Women Lutheran bishops
21st-century Lutheran bishops
21st-century German Protestant theologians
Women Christian theologians
People from Wesselburen
1961 births
Living people
21st-century German Lutheran bishops